Chile at the 1956 Summer Olympics in Melbourne, Australia was the nation's tenth appearance out of thirteen editions of the Summer Olympic Games. The nation was represented by a team of 33 athletes, 31 males and 2 females, that competed in 22 events in 8 sports. This edition marked Chile's 4 through 7 medals, two each in the silver and bronze categories.

Medalists

Athletics

Men's Marathon 
Eduardo Fontecilla — did not finish (→ no ranking)
Eduardo Silva — did not finish (→ no ranking)

Basketball

Preliminary Round, Group D

Quarter-finals, Group A

5th–8th place classification

Boxing

Cycling

Sprint
Hernán Masanés — 11th place

Time trial
Hernán Masanés — 1:14.7 (→ 14th place)

Individual road race
Juan Pérez — 5:25:38 (→ 21st place)

Diving

Men's 10m Platform
Günther Mund Borgs
 Preliminary Round — 63.01 (→ did not advance, 19th place)

Modern pentathlon

Three male pentathletes represented Chile in 1956.

Individual
 Gerardo Cortes, Sr.
 Nilo Floody
 Héctor Carmona

Team
 Gerardo Cortes, Sr.
 Nilo Floody
 Héctor Carmona

Rowing

Chile had three male rowers participate in one out of seven rowing events in 1956.

 Men's coxed pair
 Juan Carmona
 Jorge Contreras
 Eusebio Ojeda (cox)

Shooting

Three shooters represented Chile in 1956.

25 m pistol
 Eliazar Guzmán
 Ignacio Cruzat

50 m pistol
 Ignacio Cruzat
 Rigoberto Fontt

References

External links
Official Olympic Reports
International Olympic Committee results database

Nations at the 1956 Summer Olympics
1956
1956 in Chilean sport